Linn Blohm (born 20 May 1992) is a Swedish professional handballer who plays as a pivot for Győri ETO KC and the Swedish national team.

Achievements
EHF Champions League:
Silver medalist: 2022
EHF Cup / EHF European League:
Winner: 2015
Bronze Medalist: 2021
EHF Cup Winners' Cup:
Winner: 2016
Romanian League
Silver Medalist: 2021
Hungarian Championship
Winner: 2022
Hungarian Cup
Silver Medalist: 2022
Swedish Championship
Winner: 2012, 2013, 2014

Individual awards
All-Star Pivot of the World Championship: 2019
All-Star Pivot of the Danish League: 2020
All-Star Pivot of the Romanian League: 2021
Swedish Female Handballer of the Year: 2020
 All-Star Pivot of the EHF Champions League: 2022

Personal life
Blohm is deaf in her left ear. She has a child, born in March 2018. She supports AIK IF.

References

External links

1992 births
Living people
Handball players from Stockholm
Swedish female handball players
Expatriate handball players
Swedish expatriate sportspeople in Denmark
Swedish expatriate sportspeople in Romania
Handball players at the 2016 Summer Olympics
Olympic handball players of Sweden
IK Sävehof players
FCM Håndbold players 
TTH Holstebro players
CS Minaur Baia Mare (women's handball) players
Handball players at the 2020 Summer Olympics